Manross may refer to:

People:
 Mary Manross, American politician
 Newton Spaulding Manross (1825–1862), American mining engineer
 Park Manross (1895–1951), member of the Canadian House of Commons

Places:
Manross, an historic township of Kenora District, Ontario, Canada